Geo-Jade Petroleum is a Chinese real estate development and oil exploration and production company with oilfields in Kazakhstan as well as exploration activity in Kazakhstan and Russia.

The company has made two major acquisitions in 2014–15. In December 2014 it completed the acquisition of 95% of the shares of Maten Petroleum for $526 million. Maten Petroleum's main assets are located in three oil field blocks in production in Kazakhstan, the Matin, Eastern Kokarna and Kara-Arna oil fields. In the other deal, in January 2015 the company announced a $400 million acquisition of Kozhan JSC, an oil producing company in Kazkahstan with rights to develop the Morskoye, Karatal, Dauletally fields in Atyrau Oblast.

The company's stock is listed in the Shanghai Stock Exchange (600759.SH) since October 8, 1996.

References

Oil companies of China
Companies listed on the Shanghai Stock Exchange